The mountain galaxias is a species complex of freshwater galaxiid fish found all over southeast Australia.

Species complex
Recent studies have identified fifteen species within the complex including three previously known species (shown in this list by )

Galaxias aequipinnis, Raadik, 2014
Galaxias arcanus, Raadik, 2014
Galaxias brevissimus, Raadik, 2014 
 Galaxias fuscus, Mack, 1936
Galaxias gunaikurnai, Raadik, 2014
Galaxias lanceolatus, Raadik, 2014
Galaxias longifundus, Raadik, 2014
Galaxias mcdowalli, Raadik, 2014
Galaxias mungadhan, Raadik, 2014
 Galaxias olidus, Günther, 1866
Galaxias oliros, Raadik, 2014
 Galaxias ornatus, Castelnau, 1873
Galaxias supremus, Raadik, 2014
Galaxias tantangara, Raadik, 2014
Galaxias terenasus, Raadik, 2014

Range

Mountain galaxias occupies a vast geographical range from southern Queensland to the Adelaide Hills in South Australia, and while occurring widely in the Murray-Darling river system, are also found in eastern and southern coastal systems.  How much of their coastal distribution is due to natural river capture events (although it is certain much of it is) and how much of it may be due to migration is not clear, for many mountain galaxias species have the ability to "climb" natural migration barriers with modified pelvic fin structures. Individual species within the complex have ranges varying from across almost the entire range of the complex itself down to extremely restricted ranges within a single or only a very small number of catchments.

References

External links
 Video of Mountain Galaxias in the Grampians National Park, Victoria, Australia
 Native Fish Australia - Mountain Galaxias page

Galaxias
Freshwater fish of Australia
Fish described in 1866